Rock in China is a website dedicated to the documenting and archiving of contemporary Chinese music, ranging from rock music to punk, metal, electro, jazz and hiphop. It was founded in 2004, and in 2006 became a wiki. The website currently runs on MediaWiki and Semantic MediaWiki.

Timeline of Rock in China 

In April 2004, Rock in China started as subsection named Metal in China at the Painkiller Heavy Music Magazine.

In December 2006, Rock in China opened a wiki.

February 2007: RiC collaborated with Last.fm and started its own non-commercial promotion label, getting bands such as Hang on the Box, Tookoo, No Name, Blood Funk and The Fuck'ndrolls to work with them.

September 2007: The founders of RiC were invited to the China Calling in Berlin 2007 and the German Popkomm 2007.

April 2008: Rock in China became a media partner of the German Esplanade.

October 2008: Rock in China became a media partner of the 20th anniversary of the Goethe-Institut.

November 2008: Rock in China started a cooperation with the Institute of Sinology at the University of Heidelberg.

Since 2008, Rock in China has been an official partner of the Midi Music Festival, China's largest rock music festival, and has helped to prepare their English-language websites.

In November 2012, Rock in China rolled out Semantic Mediawiki and connected their database to the Open Linked Data Cloud featuring over 50000 data triplets. The same month the page also extended their service to Music-China.org and included non-rock music specific content, including Chinese Opera, classical music of China and Cantopop/Mandopop.

In March 2013, Music-China.org started an academic online project with the aim to map the complete history of Chinese music.

Reception 
 Rock in China was featured twice in publications of the Insider's Guide to Beijing series as one of the best websites for foreigners to get infos on Chinese rock. (publications: 2006 and 2007)
 China Music Radar: "Rock in China is by far the most comprehensive English language resource on Chinese contemporary music." - link
 Beijing Review: "... the most comprehensive Web portal there is on Chinese rock" - link
 Smart Shanghai: "... they also provide a great way to kill a few hours on the internet with their wiki articles." - link

References

External links
  and its sister page Music-China.org

Chinese music websites
Internet properties established in 2004
MediaWiki websites
Chinese online encyclopedias
Semantic wikis